Ploatz is a hearty sheet cake made of rye bread dough with variable topping, a speciality of the Haune valley of Hesse, Germany. It is common in Upper Hesse, Franconia, Middle Franconia, Rhön and Hohenlohe.

References

Hessian cuisine
German breads